Olive is an unincorporated community in Creek County, Oklahoma, United States. The post office was established November 20, 1896, and discontinued September 30, 1938. The town was named for the daughter of the first postmaster. In 1974 there was a tornado that wiped out the town. Today, it is a small community with 42 homes or roughly 126 people. There are three churches, a convenience store called "Happy Corner," and a small school of 465 students Pre-K through 12. Olive was the birthplace of Leon "Jack" Guthrie.

References

Unincorporated communities in Creek County, Oklahoma
Unincorporated communities in Oklahoma